Egypt Lake is an unincorporated community in northwestern Hillsborough County, Florida, United States. It is located within the census-designated place of Egypt Lake-Leto. It was a separate census-designated place from 1970 to 1990. The population as of the 1990 census was 14,580.  The ZIP code for Egypt Lake is 33614.

Geography and transportation

Egypt Lake is located at 28 degrees north, 82.5 degrees west (28.016963, -82.495373); or approximately four miles northwest of Tampa.

Egypt Lake boundaries include the city of Tampa to the south and east, Carrollwood to the north, and Dale Mabry Highway to the west.

Some of the major surface roads serving the community include:
Dale Mabry Highway
Waters Avenue
Himes Avenue
Lambright Street

Education
The community of Egypt Lake is served by Hillsborough County Schools. Egypt Lake Elementary School is located within the community.

References

External links
 Egypt Lake on Florida Cities listing
Egypt Lake profile from USA Cities online

Unincorporated communities in Hillsborough County, Florida
Former census-designated places in Hillsborough County, Florida
Unincorporated communities in Florida
Former census-designated places in Florida